Kunle Adegbola (born 11 February 1984) is a Nigerian cricketer. He played in the 2013 ICC World Cricket League Division Six tournament.

References

External links
 

1984 births
Living people
Nigerian cricketers
Place of birth missing (living people)
Yoruba sportspeople